The 1980 Cork Senior Hurling Championship was the 92nd staging of the Cork Senior Hurling Championship since its establishment by the Cork County Board in 1887. The championship began on 6 April 1980 and ended on 12 October 1980.

Blackrock entered the championship as the defending champions in search of a third successive title, however, they were beaten by Glen Rovers in the semi-finals.

The final was played on 12 October 1980 at Páirc Uí Chaoimh in Cork, between St. Finbarr's and Glen Rovers, in what was their first meeting in the final in three years. St. Finbarr's won the match by 1-09 to 2-04 to claim their 20th championship title overall and their first title in three years.

Midleton's John Fenton was the championship's top scorer.

Team changes

To Championship

Promoted from the Cork Intermediate Hurling Championship
 Éire Óg

Division 1

Division 1 results

Division 2

Division 2 results

Division 3

Division 3 first round

Division 3 semi-finals

Division 3 final

Knock-out stage

Quarter-finals

Semi-finals

Final

References

Cork Senior Hurling Championship
Cork Senior Hurling Championship